Dirk Wiese (born 11 July 1983) is a German politician of the Social Democratic Party (SPD) who has been serving as a member of the Bundestag from the state of North Rhine-Westphalia since 2013.

In addition to his parliamentary work, Wiese served as a Parliamentary State Secretary at the Federal Ministry of Economic Affairs and Energy under Minister Brigitte Zypries, in the coalition government of Chancellor Angela Merkel from 2017 until 2018. From 2018 until 2020, he was the German government's Coordinator for Inter-Societal Cooperation with Russia, Central Asia and the Eastern Partnership Countries at the Federal Foreign Office.

Early career 
From 2010 until 2013, Wiese worked as legislative advisor to Franz Müntefering.

Political career 
Wiese became a member of the Bundestag in the 2013 German federal election, representing the Hochsauerlandkreis district.

In parliament Wiese has served as a member of the Committee on Food and Agriculture (2014-2015, 2018–2020), the Committee on Legal Affairs and Consumer Protection (2014-2017); the Subcommittee on the United Nations, International Organizations and Globalization (2014-2017); and the Committee on Economic Affairs and Energy (2015-2017). Since 2014, he has been an alternate member of the parliamentary body in charge of appointing judges to the Highest Courts of Justice, namely the Federal Court of Justice (BGH), the Federal Administrative Court (BVerwG), the Federal Fiscal Court (BFH), the Federal Labour Court (BAG), and the Federal Social Court (BSG). Since 2020, he has been serving as one of his parliamentary group's deputy chairpersons, under the leadership of chairman Rolf Mützenich.

In addition to his committee assignments, Wiese has been chairing the German-Indian Parliamentary Friendship Group since 2018. He is also part of a cross-party group in support of Schützenverein culture. Within his parliamentary group, he has been serving as one of the three speakers of the Seeheim Circle since 2018.

Other activities
 Business Forum of the Social Democratic Party of Germany, Member of the Political Advisory Board (since 2020)
 German Foundation for International Legal Cooperation (IRZ), Member (since 2020)
 Memorial to the Murdered Jews of Europe Foundation, Member of the Board of Trustees (since 2020)
 Agency for Renewable Resources (FNR), Member of the advisory board (2018-2020)

Political positions
Amid the COVID-19 pandemic in Germany, Wiese joined forces with six other parliamentarians – Heike Baehrens, Dagmar Schmidt, Janosch Dahmen, Till Steffen, Katrin Helling-Plahr and Marie-Agnes Strack-Zimmermann – on a cross-party initiative in 2022 to support legislation that would require all adults to be vaccinated.

References

External links

  
 Bundestag biography 

1983 births
Living people
Members of the Bundestag for North Rhine-Westphalia
Members of the Bundestag 2021–2025
Members of the Bundestag 2017–2021
Members of the Bundestag 2013–2017
Members of the Bundestag for the Social Democratic Party of Germany